Harry Winokur created the Mister Donut chain of doughnut shops.  The chain grew to include 550 shops before being bought out by the parent company of Dunkin' Donuts in 1990. He was awarded the Horatio Alger Award in 1965.

References

American businesspeople
Year of birth missing (living people)
Living people